Vaari Vaari is the studio album by Harbhajan Mann released on 15 September 2010.

Awards
The album won the following award at the 2011 PTC Punjabi Music Awards:
Best Pop Vocalist (Male) for Harbhajan Mann (Vaari Vaari)

Track listing
All music composed by Jaidev Kumar and lyrics was given by Babu Singh Maan.

References 

2010 albums